Bernd Paul Hoffmann (born 21 January 1963) was Chairman of 2. Bundesliga club Hamburger SV from 2003 to 2011 and from 2018 to 2020.

Life
Hoffman graduated from the University of Cologne in 1989 with a master's degree in Business Administration.

On 1 February 2003 Hoffman was elected to the role of chief executive of HSV with an initial four year contract; this contract was extended in December 2007 to December 2011, his contract subsequently terminated and he left the club. He was elected to the office of President of the club on 18 February 2018 with 51.1% of the votes cast and will serve a four-year term.

Hoffmann is divorced, has four children (twice twins) and lives with his girlfriend Sandra Henke in Hamburg.

References

1963 births
Living people
Hamburger SV
German football chairmen and investors